The 2018 Mercedes-Benz UCI Mountain Bike World Cup was a series of races in Olympic Cross-Country (XCO), Cross-Country Eliminator (XCE), and Downhill (DHI). Each discipline had an Elite Men and an Elite Women category. There were also under-23 categories in the XCO and junior categories in the DHI. The cross-country series and the downhill series each had seven rounds, some of which were held concurrently.

The 2018 series returned to some classic venues, including Fort William, Nové Město, and Mont-Sainte-Anne.  There was also a race in Stellenbosch, which was the first time a World Cup race had been held in South Africa since 2014.

Cross-country

Elite

Under 23

Downhill

Elite

Junior

World Cup standings
Standings after 7 of 7 events

Men

Women

See also
2018 UCI Mountain Bike World Championships

References

External links
 UCI Homepage
2018 MTB calendar on the UCI website

UCI Mountain Bike World Cup
Mountain Bike World Cup